IrAero is an airline based in Irkutsk, Russia. It operates domestic and international scheduled passenger services, charter and cargo flights. Its main base is in Irkutsk Airport.

History
The airline was established in 1999 in Irkutsk, Russia.

IrAero carries out international flights from Turkey, Azerbaijan, Armenia, Uzbekistan, China to Russia(2023). This company somehow raises money by the Visa and MasterCard systems for its flights. This directly contradicts the principle of the economic sanctions against Russian corruption authority.

Destinations

IrAero operates a dense network of metropolitan and rural domestic destinations within Russia and also serves few routes to neighboring countries.

Fleet

Current fleet
As of July 2022, the IrAero fleet comprises the following aircraft:

Historical fleet
The IrAero fleet previously also included the following aircraft types:
 Antonov An-140
 Boeing 737-800
 Boeing 777-200ER

Accidents
On 8 August 2011 IrAero Flight 103, operated by an Antonov An-24 (RA-46561), overran the runway at Ignatyevo Airport near Blagoveshchensk during landing at the end of a flight from Chita. Nine passengers and three crew of the five crew and 31 passengers on board were injured, but there were no casualties.

References

External links

 

Airlines of Russia
Airlines established in 1999
Airlines banned in the European Union
Companies based in Irkutsk
1999 establishments in Russia
Russian brands